Con Brio may refer to:
Con brio, a musical direction, meaning "with spirit" or "with vigor"
Con brio (Widmann), a composition by Jörg Widmann
Con Brio (band), a funk band based in San Francisco
Con Brio, Inc., a defunct synthesizer manufacturer
Con Brio Records, a defunct record label
Con brio (novel), a 1998 novel by Slovenian author Brina Švigelj-Mérat